Selective serotonin reuptake inhibitors (SSRIs) are a class of drugs that are typically used as antidepressants in the treatment of major depressive disorder, anxiety disorders, and other psychological conditions.

SSRIs increase the extracellular level of the neurotransmitter serotonin by limiting its reabsorption (reuptake) into the presynaptic cell. They have varying degrees of selectivity for the other monoamine transporters, with pure SSRIs having strong affinity for the serotonin transporter and only weak affinity for the norepinephrine and dopamine transporters.

SSRIs are the most widely prescribed antidepressants in many countries. The efficacy of SSRIs in mild or moderate cases of depression has been disputed and may or may not be outweighed by side effects, especially in adolescent populations.

Medical uses
The main indication for SSRIs is major depressive disorder; however, they are frequently prescribed for anxiety disorders, such as social anxiety disorder, generalized anxiety disorder, panic disorder, obsessive–compulsive disorder (OCD), eating disorders, chronic pain, and, in some cases, for posttraumatic stress disorder (PTSD). They are also frequently used to treat depersonalization disorder, although with varying results.

Depression
Antidepressants are recommended by the UK National Institute for Health and Care Excellence (NICE) as a first-line treatment of severe depression and for the treatment of mild-to-moderate depression that persists after conservative measures such as cognitive therapy. They recommend against their routine use by those who have chronic health problems and mild depression.

There has been controversy regarding the efficacy of SSRIs in treating depression depending on its severity and duration.
 Two meta-analyses published in 2008 (Kirsch) and 2010 (Fournier) found that in mild and moderate depression, the effect of SSRIs is small or none compared to placebo, while in very severe depression the effect of SSRIs is between "relatively small" and "substantial". The 2008 meta-analysis combined 35 clinical trials submitted to the Food and Drug Administration (FDA) before licensing of four newer antidepressants (including the SSRIs paroxetine and fluoxetine, the non-SSRI antidepressant nefazodone, and the serotonin and norepinephrine reuptake inhibitor (SNRI) venlafaxine). The authors attributed the relationship between severity and efficacy to a reduction of the placebo effect in severely depressed patients, rather than an increase in the effect of the medication. Some researchers have questioned the statistical basis of this study suggesting that it underestimates the effect size of antidepressants.
 A 2012 meta-analysis of fluoxetine and venlafaxine concluded that statistically and clinically significant treatment effects were observed for each drug relative to placebo irrespective of baseline depression severity; some of the authors however disclosed substantial relationships with pharmaceutical industries.
 A 2017 systematic review stated that "SSRIs versus placebo seem to have statistically significant effects on depressive symptoms, but the clinical significance of these effects seems questionable and all trials were at high risk of bias. Furthermore, SSRIs versus placebo significantly increase the risk of both serious and non-serious adverse events. Our results show that the harmful effects of SSRIs versus placebo for major depressive disorder seem to outweigh any potentially small beneficial effects". Fredrik Hieronymus et al. criticized the review as inaccurate and misleading, but they also disclosed multiple ties to pharmaceutical industries and receipt of speaker's fees.

In 2018, a systematic review and network meta-analysis comparing the efficacy and acceptability of 21 antidepressant drugs showed escitalopram to be one of the most effective.

The use of SSRIs in children with depression remains controversial. A 2021 Cochrane review concluded that, for children and adolescents, SSRIs "may reduce depression symptoms in a small and unimportant way compared with placebo." However, it also noted significant methodological limitations that make drawing definitive conclusions about efficacy difficult. Fluoxetine is the only SSRI authorized for use in children and adolescents with moderate to severe depression in the United Kingdom.

Social anxiety disorder
Some SSRIs are effective for social anxiety disorder, although their effects on symptoms is not always robust and their use is sometimes rejected in favor of psychological therapies. Paroxetine was the first drug to be approved for social anxiety disorder and it is considered effective for this disorder, sertraline and fluvoxamine were later approved for it, too, escitalopram and citalopram are used off label with acceptable efficacy, while fluoxetine is not considered to be effective for this disorder.

Post-traumatic stress disorder
PTSD is relatively hard to treat and generally treatment is not highly effective; SSRIs are no exception. They are not very effective for this disorder and only two SSRI are FDA approved for this condition, paroxetine and sertraline. Paroxetine has slightly higher response and remission rates for PTSD than sertraline, but both are not fully effective for many patients.   Fluoxetine is used off label, but with mixed results; venlafaxine, an SNRI, is considered somewhat effective, although used off label, too. Fluvoxamine, escitalopram and citalopram are not well tested in this disorder. Paroxetine remains the most suitable drug for PTSD as of now, but with limited benefits.

Generalized anxiety disorder
SSRIs are recommended by the National Institute for Health and Care Excellence (NICE) for the treatment of generalized anxiety disorder (GAD) that has failed to respond to conservative measures such as education and self-help activities. GAD is a common disorder of which the central feature is excessive worry about a number of different events. Key symptoms include excessive anxiety about multiple events and issues, and difficulty controlling worrisome thoughts that persists for at least 6 months.

Antidepressants provide a modest-to-moderate reduction in anxiety in GAD, and are superior to placebo in treating GAD. The efficacy of different antidepressants is similar.

Obsessive–compulsive disorder
In Canada, SSRIs are a first-line treatment of adult obsessive–compulsive disorder (OCD). In the UK, they are first-line treatment only with moderate to severe functional impairment and as second line treatment for those with mild impairment, though, as of early 2019, this recommendation is being reviewed. In children, SSRIs can be considered a second line therapy in those with moderate-to-severe impairment, with close monitoring for psychiatric adverse effects. SSRIs, especially fluvoxamine, which is the first one to be FDA approved for OCD, are efficacious in its treatment; patients treated with SSRIs are about twice as likely to respond to treatment as those treated with placebo. Efficacy has been demonstrated both in short-term treatment trials of 6 to 24 weeks and in discontinuation trials of 28 to 52 weeks duration.

Panic disorder
Paroxetine CR was superior to placebo on the primary outcome measure. In a 10-wk randomized controlled, double-blind trial escitalopram was more effective than placebo. Fluvoxamine, another SSRI, has shown positive results. However, evidence for their effectiveness and acceptability is unclear.

Eating disorders
Antidepressants are recommended as an alternative or additional first step to self-help programs in the treatment of bulimia nervosa. SSRIs (fluoxetine in particular) are preferred over other anti-depressants due to their acceptability, tolerability, and superior reduction of symptoms in short-term trials. Long-term efficacy remains poorly characterized.

Similar recommendations apply to binge eating disorder. SSRIs provide short-term reductions in binge eating behavior, but have not been associated with significant weight loss.

Clinical trials have generated mostly negative results for the use of SSRIs in the treatment of anorexia nervosa. Treatment guidelines from the National Institute of Health and Clinical Excellence recommend against the use of SSRIs in this disorder. Those from the American Psychiatric Association note that SSRIs confer no advantage regarding weight gain, but that they may be used for the treatment of co-existing depressive, anxiety, or OCD.

Stroke recovery
SSRIs have been used off-label in the treatment of stroke patients, including those with and without symptoms of depression. A 2019 meta-analysis of randomized, controlled clinical trials found a statistically significant effect of SSRIs on dependence, neurological deficit, depression, and anxiety but the studies had a high risk of bias. No reliable evidence points to their routine use to promote recovery following stroke.  Thrombosis risk is reduced because SSRIs limit serotonin availability to platelets, so benefits, such as stroke recovery, of reduced clotting go up, with SSRIs.

Premature ejaculation

SSRIs are effective for the treatment of premature ejaculation. Taking SSRIs on a chronic, daily basis is more effective than taking them prior to sexual activity. The increased efficacy of treatment when taking SSRIs on a daily basis is consistent with clinical observations that the therapeutic effects of SSRIs generally take several weeks to emerge. Sexual dysfunction ranging from decreased libido to anorgasmia is usually considered to be a significantly distressing side effect which may lead to noncompliance in patients receiving SSRIs. However, for those with premature ejaculation, this very same side effect becomes the desired effect.

Other uses
SSRIs such as sertraline have been found to be effective in decreasing anger.

Side effects
Side effects vary among the individual drugs of this class and may include:
 increased risk of bone fractures
 akathisia
 suicidal ideation (thoughts of suicide) and other risks (see below)

Sexual dysfunction
SSRIs can cause various types of sexual dysfunction such as anorgasmia, erectile dysfunction, diminished libido, genital numbness, and sexual anhedonia (pleasureless orgasm). Sexual problems are common with SSRIs. While initial trials showed side effects in 5-15% of users (based on spontaneous reporting by users), later studies (based on asking patients directly) have shown side effect rates from 36% to 98%.  Poor sexual function is also one of the most common reasons people stop the medication.

In some cases, symptoms of sexual dysfunction may persist after discontinuation of SSRIs. This combination of symptoms is sometimes referred to as Post-SSRI Sexual Dysfunction (PSSD). On the 11th of June 2019 the Pharmacovigilance Risk Assessment Committee of the European Medicines Agency concluded that a possible relationship exists between SSRI use and persistent sexual dysfunction after cessation of use.  The committee concluded that a warning should be added to the label of SSRIs and SNRIs regarding this possible risk.

The mechanism by which SSRIs may cause sexual side effects is not well understood . The range of possible mechanisms includes (1) nonspecific neurological effects (e.g., sedation) that globally impair behavior including sexual function; (2) specific effects on brain systems mediating sexual function; (3) specific effects on peripheral tissues and organs, such as the penis, that mediate sexual function; and (4) direct or indirect effects on hormones mediating sexual function. Management strategies include: for erectile dysfunction the addition of a PDE5 inhibitor such as sildenafil; for decreased libido, possibly adding or switching to bupropion; and for overall sexual dysfunction, switching to nefazodone.

A number of non-SSRI drugs are not associated with sexual side effects (such as bupropion, mirtazapine, tianeptine, agomelatine, tranylcypromine and moclobemide).

Several studies have suggested that SSRIs may adversely affect semen quality.

While trazodone (an antidepressant with alpha adrenergic receptor blockade) is a notorious cause of priapism, cases of priapism have also been reported with certain SSRIs (e.g. fluoxetine, citalopram).

Emotional blunting
Certain antidepressants may cause emotional blunting, characterized by reduced intensity of both positive and negative emotions as well as symptoms of apathy, indifference, and amotivation. It may be experienced as either beneficial or detrimental depending on the situation. This side effect has been particularly associated with serotonergic antidepressants like SSRIs and SNRIs, but may be less with atypical antidepressants like bupropion, agomelatine, and vortioxetine. Higher doses of antidepressants seem to be more likely to produce emotional blunting than lower doses. It can be decreased by reducing dosage, discontinuing the medication, or switching to a different antidepressant that may have less propensity for causing this side effect.

Violence
Researcher David Healy and others have reviewed available data, concluding that SSRIs increase violent acts, in adults and children, both on therapy and during withdrawal. This view is also shared by some patient activist groups.

Vision
Acute narrow-angle glaucoma is the most common and important ocular side effect of SSRIs, and often goes misdiagnosed.

Cardiac
SSRIs do not appear to affect the risk of coronary heart disease (CHD) in those without a previous diagnosis of CHD. A large cohort study suggested no substantial increase in the risk of cardiac malformations attributable to SSRI usage during the first trimester of pregnancy. A number of large studies of people without known pre-existing heart disease have reported no EKG changes related to SSRI use. The recommended maximum daily dose of citalopram and escitalopram was reduced due to concerns with QT prolongation. In overdose, fluoxetine has been reported to cause sinus tachycardia, myocardial infarction, junctional rhythms and trigeminy. Some authors have suggested electrocardiographic monitoring in patients with severe pre-existing cardiovascular disease who are taking SSRIs.

Bleeding
SSRIs directly increase the risk of abnormal bleeding by lowering platelet serotonin levels, which are essential to platelet-driven hemostasis.
SSRIs interact with anticoagulants, like warfarin, and antiplatelet drugs, like aspirin. This includes an increased risk of GI bleeding, and post operative bleeding. The relative risk of intracranial bleeding is increased, but the absolute risk is very low. SSRIs are known to cause platelet dysfunction. This risk is greater in those who are also on anticoagulants, antiplatelet agents and NSAIDs (nonsteroidal anti-inflammatory drugs), as well as with the co-existence of underlying diseases such as cirrhosis of the liver or liver failure.

Fracture risk
Evidence from longitudinal, cross-sectional, and prospective cohort studies suggests an association between SSRI usage at therapeutic doses and a decrease in bone mineral density, as well as increased fracture risk, a relationship that appears to persist even with adjuvant bisphosphonate therapy. However, because the relationship between SSRIs and fractures is based on observational data as opposed to prospective trials, the phenomenon is not definitively causal. There also appears to be an increase in fracture-inducing falls with SSRI use, suggesting the need for increased attention to fall risk in elderly patients using the medication. The loss of bone density does not appear to occur in younger patients taking SSRIs.

Bruxism 
SSRI and SNRI antidepressants may cause jaw pain/jaw spasm reversible syndrome (although it is not common). Buspirone appears to be successful in treating bruxism on SSRI/SNRI induced jaw clenching.

Serotonin syndrome 

Serotonin syndrome is typically caused by the use of two or more serotonergic drugs, including SSRIs. Serotonin syndrome is a condition that can range from mild (most common) to deadly. Mild symptoms may consist of increased heart rate, fever, shivering, sweating, dilated pupils, myoclonus (intermittent jerking or twitching), as well as hyperreflexia. Concomitant use of SSRIs or SNRIs for depression with a triptan for migraine does not appear to heighten the risk of the serotonin syndrome. Taking monoamine oxidase inhibitors (MAOIs) in combination with SSRIs can be fatal, since MAOIs disrupt monoamine oxidase, an enzyme which is needed to break down serotonin and other neurotransmitters. Without monoamine oxidase, the body is unable to eliminate excess neurotransmitters, allowing them to build up to dangerous levels. The prognosis for recovery in a hospital setting is generally good if serotonin syndrome is correctly identified. Treatment consists of discontinuing any serotonergic drugs and providing supportive care to manage agitation and hyperthermia, usually with benzodiazepines.

Suicide risk

Children and adolescents
Meta analyses of short duration randomized clinical trials have found that SSRI use is related to a higher risk of suicidal behavior in children and adolescents. For instance, a 2004 U.S. Food and Drug Administration (FDA) analysis of clinical trials on children with major depressive disorder found statistically significant increases of the risks of "possible suicidal ideation and suicidal behavior" by about 80%, and of agitation and hostility by about 130%. According to the FDA, the heightened risk of suicidality is within the first one to two months of treatment. The National Institute for Health and Care Excellence (NICE) places the excess risk in the "early stages of treatment". The European Psychiatric Association places the excess risk in the first two weeks of treatment and, based on a combination of epidemiological, prospective cohort, medical claims, and randomized clinical trial data, concludes that a protective effect dominates after this early period. A 2014 Cochrane review found that at six to nine months, suicidal ideation remained higher in children treated with antidepressants compared to those treated with psychological therapy.

A recent comparison of aggression and hostility occurring during treatment with fluoxetine to placebo in children and adolescents found that no significant difference between the fluoxetine group and a placebo group. There is also evidence that higher rates of SSRI prescriptions are associated with lower rates of suicide in children, though since the evidence is correlational, the true nature of the relationship is unclear.

In 2004, the Medicines and Healthcare products Regulatory Agency (MHRA) in the United Kingdom judged fluoxetine (Prozac) to be the only antidepressant that offered a favorable risk-benefit ratio in children with depression, though it was also associated with a slight increase in the risk of self-harm and suicidal ideation. Only two SSRIs are licensed for use with children in the UK, sertraline (Zoloft) and fluvoxamine (Luvox), and only for the treatment of obsessive–compulsive disorder. Fluoxetine is not licensed for this use.

Adults
It is unclear whether SSRIs affect the risk of suicidal behavior in adults.
 A 2005 meta-analysis of drug company data found no evidence that SSRIs increased the risk of suicide; however, important protective or hazardous effects could not be excluded.
 A 2005 review observed that suicide attempts are increased in those who use SSRIs as compared to placebo and compared to therapeutic interventions other than tricyclic antidepressants. No difference risk of suicide attempts was detected between SSRIs versus tricyclic antidepressants.
 On the other hand, a 2006 review suggests that the widespread use of antidepressants in the new "SSRI-era" appears to have led to a highly significant decline in suicide rates in most countries with traditionally high baseline suicide rates. The decline is particularly striking for women who, compared with men, seek more help for depression. Recent clinical data on large samples in the US too have revealed a protective effect of antidepressant against suicide.
 A 2006 meta-analysis of random controlled trials suggests that SSRIs increase suicide ideation compared with placebo. However, the observational studies suggest that SSRIs did not increase suicide risk more than older antidepressants. The researchers stated that if SSRIs increase suicide risk in some patients, the number of additional deaths is very small because ecological studies have generally found that suicide mortality has declined (or at least not increased) as SSRI use has increased.
 An additional meta-analysis by the FDA in 2006 found an age-related effect of SSRI's. Among adults younger than 25 years, results indicated that there was a higher risk for suicidal behavior. For adults between 25 and 64, the effect appears neutral on suicidal behavior but possibly protective for suicidal behavior for adults between the ages of 25 and 64. For adults older than 64, SSRI's seem to reduce the risk of both suicidal behavior.
 In 2016 a study criticized the effects of the FDA Black Box suicide warning inclusion in the prescription. The authors discussed the suicide rates might increase also as a consequence of the warning.

Risk of death
A 2017 meta-analysis found that antidepressants including SSRIs were associated with significantly increased risk of death (+33%) and new cardiovascular complications (+14%) in the general population. Conversely, risks were not greater in people with existing cardiovascular disease.

Pregnancy and breastfeeding
SSRI use in pregnancy has been associated with a variety of risks with varying degrees of proof of causation. As depression is independently associated with negative pregnancy outcomes, determining the extent to which observed associations between antidepressant use and specific adverse outcomes reflects a causative relationship has been difficult in some cases. In other cases, the attribution of adverse outcomes to antidepressant exposure seems fairly clear.

SSRI use in pregnancy is associated with an increased risk of spontaneous abortion of about 1.7-fold. Use is also associated with preterm birth. According to some researches, decreased body weight of the child, intrauterine growth retardation, neonatal adaptive syndrome, and persistent pulmonary hypertension also was noted.

A systematic review of the risk of major birth defects in antidepressant-exposed pregnancies found a small increase (3% to 24%) in the risk of major malformations and a risk of cardiovascular birth defects that did not differ from non-exposed pregnancies.  Other studies have found an increased risk of cardiovascular birth defects among depressed mothers not undergoing SSRI treatment, suggesting the possibility of ascertainment bias, e.g. that worried mothers may pursue more aggressive testing of their infants. Another study found no increase in cardiovascular birth defects and a 27% increased risk of major malformations in SSRI exposed pregnancies.

The FDA issued a statement on July 19, 2006, stating nursing mothers on SSRIs must discuss treatment with their physicians. However, the medical literature on the safety of SSRIs has determined that some SSRIs like Sertraline and Paroxetine are considered safe for breastfeeding.

Neonatal abstinence syndrome
Several studies have documented neonatal abstinence syndrome, a syndrome of neurological, gastrointestinal, autonomic, endocrine and/or respiratory symptoms among a large minority of infants with intrauterine exposure. These syndromes are short-lived, but insufficient long-term data is available to determine whether there are long-term effects.

Persistent pulmonary hypertension
Persistent pulmonary hypertension (PPHN) is a serious and life-threatening, but very rare, lung condition that occurs soon after birth of the newborn. Newborn babies with PPHN have high pressure in their lung blood vessels and are not able to get enough oxygen into their bloodstream. About 1 to 2 babies per 1000 babies born in the U.S. develop PPHN shortly after birth, and often they need intensive medical care. It is associated with about a 25% risk of significant long-term neurological deficits. A 2014 meta analysis found no increased risk of persistent pulmonary hypertension associated with exposure to SSRI's in early pregnancy and a slight increase in risk associates with exposure late in pregnancy; "an estimated 286 to 351 women would need to be treated with an SSRI in late pregnancy to result in an average of one additional case of persistent pulmonary hypertension of the newborn". A review published in 2012 reached conclusions very similar to those of the 2014 study.

Neuropsychiatric effects in offspring
According to a 2015 review available data found that "some signal exists suggesting that antenatal exposure to SSRIs may increase the risk of ASDs (autism spectrum disorders)" even though a large cohort study published in 2013 and a cohort study using data from Finland's national register between the years 1996 and 2010 and published in 2016 found no significant association between SSRI use and autism in offspring. The 2016 Finland study also found no association with ADHD, but did find an association with increased rates of depression diagnoses in early adolescence.

Bipolar switch 
In adults and children with bipolar disorder, SSRIs may cause a bipolar switch from depression into hypomania/mania. When taken with mood stabilizers, the risk of switching is not increased, however when taking SSRI's as a monotherapy, the risk of switching may be twice or three times that of the average. The changes are not often easy to detect and require monitoring by family and mental health professionals. This switch might happen even with no prior (hypo)manic episodes and might therefore not be foreseen by the psychiatrist.

Interactions
The following drugs may precipitate serotonin syndrome in people on SSRIs:
 Linezolid
 Monoamine oxidase inhibitors (MAOIs) including moclobemide, phenelzine, tranylcypromine, selegiline and methylene blue
 Lithium
 Sibutramine
 MDMA (ecstasy)
 Dextromethorphan
 Tramadol
 5-HTP
 Pethidine/meperidine
 St. John's wort
 Yohimbe
 Tricyclic antidepressants (TCAs)
 Serotonin-norepinephrine reuptake inhibitors (SNRIs)
 Buspirone
 Triptan
 Mirtazapine
 Methylene blue

Painkillers of the NSAIDs drug family may interfere and reduce efficiency of SSRIs and may compound the increased risk of gastrointestinal bleeds caused by SSRI use. NSAIDs include:
 Aspirin
 Ibuprofen (Advil, Nurofen)
 Naproxen (Aleve)

There are a number of potential pharmacokinetic interactions between the various individual SSRIs and other medications. Most of these arise from the fact that every SSRI has the ability to inhibit certain P450 cytochromes.

Legend:
0no inhibition
+mild inhibition
++moderate inhibition
+++strong inhibition

The CYP2D6 enzyme is entirely responsible for the metabolism of hydrocodone, codeine and dihydrocodeine to their active metabolites (hydromorphone, morphine, and dihydromorphine, respectively), which in turn undergo phase 2 glucuronidation. These opioids (and to a lesser extent oxycodone, tramadol, and methadone) have interaction potential with selective serotonin reuptake inhibitors. The concomitant use of some SSRIs (paroxetine and fluoxetine) with codeine may decrease the plasma concentration of active metabolite morphine, which may result in reduced analgesic efficacy.

Another important interaction of certain SSRIs involves paroxetine, a potent inhibitor of CYP2D6, and tamoxifen, an agent used commonly in the treatment and prevention of breast cancer. Tamoxifen is a prodrug that is metabolised by the hepatic cytochrome P450 enzyme system, especially CYP2D6, to its active metabolites. Concomitant use of paroxetine and tamoxifen in women with breast cancer is associated with a higher risk of death, as much as a 91 percent in women who used it the longest.

Overdose 

SSRIs appear safer in overdose when compared with traditional antidepressants, such as the tricyclic antidepressants. This relative safety is supported both by case series and studies of deaths per numbers of prescriptions. However, case reports of SSRI poisoning have indicated that severe toxicity can occur and deaths have been reported following massive single ingestions, although this is exceedingly uncommon when compared to the tricyclic antidepressants.

Because of the wide therapeutic index of the SSRIs, most patients will have mild or no symptoms following moderate overdoses. The most commonly reported severe effect following SSRI overdose is serotonin syndrome; serotonin toxicity is usually associated with very high overdoses or multiple drug ingestion. Other reported significant effects include coma, seizures, and cardiac toxicity.

Poisoning is also known in animals, and some toxicity information is available for veterinary treatment.

Discontinuation syndrome 

Serotonin reuptake inhibitors should not be abruptly discontinued after extended therapy, and whenever possible, should be tapered over several weeks to minimize discontinuation-related symptoms which may include nausea, headache, dizziness, chills, body aches, paresthesias, insomnia, and brain zaps. Paroxetine may produce discontinuation-related symptoms at a greater rate than other SSRIs, though qualitatively similar effects have been reported for all SSRIs. Discontinuation effects appear to be less for fluoxetine, perhaps owing to its long half-life and the natural tapering effect associated with its slow clearance from the body. One strategy for minimizing SSRI discontinuation symptoms is to switch the patient to fluoxetine and then taper and discontinue the fluoxetine.

Mechanism of action

Serotonin reuptake inhibition
In the brain, messages are passed from a nerve cell to another via a chemical synapse, a small gap between the cells. The presynaptic cell that sends the information releases neurotransmitters including serotonin into that gap. The neurotransmitters are then recognized by receptors on the surface of the recipient postsynaptic cell, which upon this stimulation, in turn, relays the signal. About 10% of the neurotransmitters are lost in this process; the other 90% are released from the receptors and taken up again by monoamine transporters into the sending presynaptic cell, a process called reuptake.

SSRIs inhibit the reuptake of serotonin. As a result, the serotonin stays in the synaptic gap longer than it normally would, and may repeatedly stimulate the receptors of the recipient cell. In the short run, this leads to an increase in signaling across synapses in which serotonin serves as the primary neurotransmitter. On chronic dosing, the increased occupancy of post-synaptic serotonin receptors signals the pre-synaptic neuron to synthesize and release less serotonin. Serotonin levels within the synapse drop, then rise again, ultimately leading to downregulation of post-synaptic serotonin receptors. Other, indirect effects may include increased norepinephrine output, increased neuronal cyclic AMP levels, and increased levels of regulatory factors such as BDNF and CREB. Owing to the lack of a widely accepted comprehensive theory of the biology of mood disorders, there is no widely accepted theory of how these changes lead to the mood-elevating and anti-anxiety effects of SSRIs.

Their effects on serotonin blood levels, which take weeks to take effect, appear to be largely responsible for their slow-to-appear psychiatric effects.
SSRIs mediate their action largely with high occupancy in a total of all serotonin transporters within the brain and through this slow downstream changes of large brain regions at therapeutic concentrations, whereas MDMA leads to an excess serotonin release in a short run. This could explain the absence of a "high" by antidepressants and in addition the contrary ability of SSRIs in expressing neuroprotective actions to the neurotoxic abilities of MDMA.

Sigma receptor ligands

In addition to their actions as reuptake inhibitors of serotonin, some SSRIs are also, coincidentally, ligands of the sigma receptors. Fluvoxamine is an agonist of the σ1 receptor, while sertraline is an antagonist of the σ1 receptor, and paroxetine does not significantly interact with the σ1 receptor. None of the SSRIs have significant affinity for the σ2 receptor, and the SNRIs, unlike the SSRIs, do not interact with either of the sigma receptors. Fluvoxamine has by far the strongest activity of the SSRIs at the σ1 receptor. High occupancy of the σ1 receptor by clinical dosages of fluvoxamine has been observed in the human brain in positron emission tomography (PET) research. It is thought that agonism of the σ1 receptor by fluvoxamine may have beneficial effects on cognition. In contrast to fluvoxamine, the relevance of the σ1 receptor in the actions of the other SSRIs is uncertain and questionable due to their very low affinity for the receptor relative to the SERT.

Anti-inflammatory effects
The role of inflammation and the immune system in depression has been extensively studied. The evidence supporting this link has been shown in numerous studies over the past ten years. Nationwide studies and meta-analyses of smaller cohort studies have uncovered a correlation between pre-existing inflammatory conditions such as type 1 diabetes, rheumatoid arthritis (RA), or hepatitis, and an increased risk of depression. Data also shows that using pro-inflammatory agents in the treatment of diseases like melanoma can lead to depression. Several meta-analytical studies have found increased levels of proinflammatory cytokines and chemokines in depressed patients. This link has led scientists to investigate the effects of antidepressants on the immune system.

SSRIs were originally invented with the goal of increasing levels of available serotonin in the extracellular spaces. However, the delayed response between when patients first begin SSRI treatment to when they see effects has led scientists to believe that other molecules are involved in the efficacy of these drugs. To investigate the apparent anti-inflammatory effects of SSRIs, both Kohler et al. and Więdłocha et al. conducted meta-analyses which have shown that after antidepressant treatment the levels of cytokines associated with inflammation are decreased. A large cohort study conducted by researchers in the Netherlands investigated the association between depressive disorders, symptoms, and antidepressants with inflammation. The study showed decreased levels of interleukin (IL)-6, a cytokine that has proinflammatory effects, in patients taking SSRIs compared to non-medicated patients.

Treatment with SSRIs has shown reduced production of inflammatory cytokines such as IL-1β, tumor necrosis factor (TNF)-α, IL-6, and interferon (IFN)-γ, which leads to a decrease in inflammation levels and subsequently a decrease in the activation level of the immune response. These inflammatory cytokines have been shown to activate microglia which are specialized macrophages that reside in the brain. Macrophages are a subset of immune cells responsible for host defense in the innate immune system. Macrophages can release cytokines and other chemicals to cause an inflammatory response. Peripheral inflammation can induce an inflammatory response in microglia and can cause neuroinflammation. SSRIs inhibit proinflammatory cytokine production which leads to less activation of microglia and peripheral macrophages. SSRIs not only inhibit the production of these proinflammatory cytokines, they also have been shown to upregulate anti-inflammatory cytokines such as IL-10. Taken together, this reduces the overall inflammatory immune response.

In addition to affecting cytokine production, there is evidence that treatment with SSRIs has effects on the proliferation and viability of immune system cells involved in both innate and adaptive immunity. Evidence shows that SSRIs can inhibit proliferation in T-cells, which are important cells for adaptive immunity and can induce inflammation. SSRIs can also induce apoptosis, programmed cell death, in T-cells. The full mechanism of action for the anti-inflammatory effects of SSRIs is not fully known. However, there is evidence for various pathways to have a hand in the mechanism. One such possible mechanism is the increased levels of cyclic adenosine monophosphate (cAMP) as a result of interference with activation of protein kinase A (PKA), a cAMP dependent protein. Other possible pathways include interference with calcium ion channels, or inducing cell death pathways like MAPK and Notch signaling pathway.

The anti-inflammatory effects of SSRIs have prompted studies of the efficacy of SSRIs in the treatment of autoimmune diseases such as multiple sclerosis, RA, inflammatory bowel diseases, and septic shock. These studies have been performed in animal models but have shown consistent immune regulatory effects. Fluoxetine, an SSRI, has also shown efficacy in animal models of graft vs. host disease. SSRIs have also been used successfully as pain relievers in patients undergoing oncology treatment. The effectiveness of this has been hypothesized to be at least in part due to the anti-inflammatory effects of SSRIs.

Pharmacogenetics

Large bodies of research are devoted to using genetic markers to predict whether patients will respond to SSRIs or have side effects that will cause their discontinuation, although these tests are not yet ready for widespread clinical use.

Versus TCAs
SSRIs are described as 'selective' because they affect only the reuptake pumps responsible for serotonin, as opposed to earlier antidepressants, which affect other monoamine neurotransmitters as well, and as a result, SSRIs have fewer side effects.

There appears to be no significant difference in effectiveness between SSRIs and tricyclic antidepressants, which were the most commonly used class of antidepressants before the development of SSRIs. However, SSRIs have the important advantage that their toxic dose is high, and, therefore, they are much more difficult to use as a means to commit suicide. Further, they have fewer and milder side effects. Tricyclic antidepressants also have a higher risk of serious cardiovascular side effects, which SSRIs lack.

SSRIs act on signal pathways such as cyclic adenosine monophosphate (cAMP) on the postsynaptic neuronal cell, which leads to the release of brain-derived neurotrophic factor (BDNF). BDNF enhances the growth and survival of cortical neurons and synapses.

List of SSRIs

Marketed

Antidepressants
 Citalopram (Celexa)
 Escitalopram (Lexapro)
 Fluoxetine (Prozac)
 Fluvoxamine (Luvox)
 Paroxetine (Paxil)
 Sertraline (Zoloft)

Others
 Dapoxetine (Priligy)

Discontinued

Antidepressants
 Indalpine (Upstène)
 Zimelidine (Zelmid)

Never marketed

Antidepressants
 Alaproclate (GEA-654)
 Centpropazine
 Cericlamine (JO-1017)
 Femoxetine (Malexil; FG-4963)
 Ifoxetine (CGP-15210)
 Omiloxetine
 Panuramine (WY-26002)
 Pirandamine (AY-23713)
 Seproxetine ((S)-norfluoxetine)

Related drugs
Although described as SNRIs, duloxetine (Cymbalta), venlafaxine (Effexor), and desvenlafaxine (Pristiq) are in fact relatively selective as serotonin reuptake inhibitors (SRIs). They are about at least 10-fold selective for inhibition of serotonin reuptake over norepinephrine reuptake. The selectivity ratios are approximately 1:30 for venlafaxine, 1:10 for duloxetine, and 1:14 for desvenlafaxine. At low doses, these SNRIs act mostly as SSRIs; only at higher doses do they also prominently inhibit norepinephrine reuptake. Milnacipran (Ixel, Savella) and its stereoisomer levomilnacipran (Fetzima) are the only widely marketed SNRIs that inhibit serotonin and norepinephrine to similar degrees, both with ratios close to 1:1.

Vilazodone (Viibryd) and vortioxetine (Trintellix) are SRIs that also act as modulators of serotonin receptors and are described as serotonin modulators and stimulators (SMS). Vilazodone is a 5-HT1A receptor partial agonist while vortioxetine is a 5-HT1A receptor agonist and 5-HT3 and 5-HT7 receptor antagonist. Litoxetine (SL 81–0385) and lubazodone (YM-992, YM-35995) are similar drugs that were never marketed. They are SRIs and litoxetine is also a 5-HT3 receptor antagonist while lubazodone is also a 5-HT2A receptor antagonist.

History

Fluoxetine was introduced in 1987 and was the first major SSRI to be marketed.

Controversy

A study examining publication of results from FDA-evaluated antidepressants concluded that those with favorable results were much more likely to be published than those with negative results. Furthermore, an investigation of 185 meta-analyses on antidepressants found that 79% of them had authors affiliated in some way to pharmaceutical companies and that they were reluctant to report caveats for antidepressants. 

David Healy has argued that warning signs were available for many years prior to regulatory authorities moving to put warnings on antidepressant labels that they might cause suicidal thoughts. At the time these warnings were added, others argued that the evidence for harm remained unpersuasive and others continued to do so after the warnings were added.

In other organisms 
SSRIs are common environmental contaminant findings near human settlement.

See also
 List of antidepressants
 Serotonin releasing agent
 Serotonin–norepinephrine reuptake inhibitor

References

External links
 WebMD – Selective Serotonin Reuptake Inhibitors

 
Sigma receptor ligands
Treatment of obsessive–compulsive disorder
Treatment of depression